First Presbyterian Church is a historic Presbyterian church located at Poughkeepsie, Dutchess County, New York.  It was built in 1905 and is a large, five sided stone building with a wing.  It features a three-story square tower with a pyramidal roof and arched Romanesque window surrounds.

It was added to the National Register of Historic Places in 1982.  The related rectory was added at the same time.

History
The First Presbyterian Church in Poughkeepsie, New York was organized in 1749. Services were conducted first in connection with Fishkill and afterwards in connection with the Charlotte Precinct, which included Washington Hollow and Pleasant Valley. 

In September 1826, the North River Presbytery re-organized the church with eighteen members and installed  Rev. Alonso Welton as pastor. The congregation first worshiped in an old frame building on Church Street, before moving to Cannon Street in December 1826.

Reverend Thomas Woodrow, maternal grandfather of President Woodrow Wilson, preached in Poughkeepsie after emigrating from Scotland in 1835.

References

Churches on the National Register of Historic Places in New York (state)
Romanesque Revival church buildings in New York (state)
Churches completed in 1905
20th-century Presbyterian church buildings in the United States
Churches in Poughkeepsie, New York
National Register of Historic Places in Poughkeepsie, New York
1905 establishments in New York (state)